Eye contact is an event in which two people look at each other's eyes at the same time.

Eye Contact may also refer to:

Eye-contact effect
Contact lenses
Eye Contact (Jay Beckenstein album)
Eye Contact (Bob Welch album)
Eye Contact (Gang Gang Dance album)